A niobium alloy is one in which the most common element is niobium.

Alloys used for the production of other alloys
The most common commercial niobium alloys are ferroniobium and nickel-niobium, produced by thermite reduction of appropriate mixtures of the oxides; these are not usable as engineering materials, but are used as convenient sources of niobium for specialist steels and nickel-based superalloys.  Going via an iron-niobium or nickel-niobium alloy avoids problems associated with the high melting point of niobium.

Superconducting alloys

Niobium-tin and Niobium-titanium are essential alloys for the industrial use of superconductors, since they remain superconducting in high magnetic fields ( for Nb3Sn,  for NbTi); there are 1200 tons of NbTi in the magnets of the Large Hadron Collider, whilst Nb3Sn is used in the windings of almost all hospital MRI machines.

Aerospace rivets
Niobium-titanium alloy, of the same composition as the superconducting one, is used for rivets in the aerospace industry; it is easier to form than CP titanium, and stronger at elevated (> 300°C) temperatures.

Refractory alloys
Niobium-1% zirconium is used in rocketry and in the nuclear industry. It is regarded as a low-strength alloy.

C-103, which is 89% Nb, 10% Hf and 1% Ti, is used for the rocket nozzle of the Apollo service module and the Merlin vacuum  engines; it is regarded as a medium-strength alloy.

High-strength alloys include C-129Y (10% tungsten, 10% hafnium, 0.1% yttrium, balance niobium), Cb-752 (10% tungsten, 2.5% zirconium), and the even higher strength C-3009 (61% niobium, 30% hafnium, 9% tungsten); these can be used at temperatures up to 1650°C with acceptable strength, though are expensive and hard to form.

Niobium alloys in general are inconvenient to weld: both sides of the weld must be protected with a stream of inert gas, because hot niobium will react with oxygen and nitrogen in the air. It is also necessary to take care (e.g. hard chrome-plating of all copper tooling) to avoid copper contamination.

References